Nils Kreicbergs (born 23 May 1996) is a Latvian handball player for Riihimäki Cocks and the Latvian national team.

He represented Latvia at the 2020 European Men's Handball Championship.

References

1996 births
Living people
Latvian male handball players
People from Dobele
Expatriate handball players
Latvian expatriate sportspeople in Finland